Andrew Ciafardini is a former Republican member of the Ohio House of Representatives, representing the 28th District for a brief month in 2008. He is currently Vice President of Corporate Communications at Vantiv Corporation, located in Symmes Township, Ohio. Previously he was Chief of Staff and Director of Communications at Chiquita Brands International.

External links
Page on the Ohio House of Representatives website

Year of birth missing (living people)
Place of birth missing (living people)
Living people
Republican Party members of the Ohio House of Representatives
21st-century American politicians